Wheatley is a town in southwest St. Francis County, Arkansas, United States. The population was 279 at the 2020 census, down from 355 in 2010.

Geography
Wheatley is located at  (34.914774, -91.108721).

Demographics

As of the 2020 United States census, there were 279 people, 191 households, and 152 families residing in the city.

As of the census of 2000, there were 372 people, 151 households, and 109 families residing in the city. The racial makeup of the city was 69.35% White, 29.30% Black or African American, 0.54% Native American, 0.27% from other races, and 0.54% from two or more races.  2.69% of the population were Hispanic or Latino of any race.

There were 151 households, out of which 29.8% had children under the age of 18 living with them, 53.6% were married couples living together, 10.6% had a female householder with no husband present, and 27.8% were non-families. 27.2% of all households were made up of individuals, and 13.2% had someone living alone who was 65 years of age or older.  The average household size was 2.46 and the average family size was 2.98.

In the city the population was spread out, with 25.5% under the age of 18, 8.6% from 18 to 24, 27.4% from 25 to 44, 23.1% from 45 to 64, and 15.3% who were 65 years of age or older.  The median age was 38 years. For every 100 females, there were 87.9 males.  For every 100 females age 18 and over, there were 85.9 males.

The median income for a household in the city was $27,813, and the median income for a family was $32,917. Males had a median income of $20,833 versus $25,938 for females. The per capita income for the city was $13,556.  About 14.7% of families and 14.6% of the population were below the poverty line, including 23.2% of those under age 18 and 16.4% of those age 65 or over.

Education 
Public education for elementary and secondary school students is available from the Palestine–Wheatley School District, which results in graduation from Palestine–Wheatley High School. It was established by the July 1, 1987 merger of the Palestine School District and the Wheatley School District. Therefore, Wheatley High School merged with the nearby Palestine High School.

References

Towns in St. Francis County, Arkansas
Towns in Arkansas